Orlando Edmundo Rodríguez Llorente (born 9 August 1984) is a Panamanian footballer.

Club career
Nicknamed Papi, Rodríguez played the majority of his career for hometown club Árabe Unido. He had spells in Colombia with Deportivo Pereira, Envigado and La Equidad and joined Salvadoran club FAS in October 2007.

In January 2010 he failed a medical test at Honduran giants Real España due to an ankle injury.

He moved abroad again to play on loan for Peruvian side León de Huánuco in February 2011, but in June 2011 his contract was terminated by mutual consent. In January 2013 he returned to El Salvador to play for Alianza, but was back at Árabe Unido in June 2013.

In January 2014 he joined San Francisco from Árabe Unido after not scoring a single goal in 11 outings for the club in the Apertura 2013, but he was released in summer 2014 after scoring only once for Sanfra.

International career
He played at the 2003 FIFA World Youth Championship in the United Arab Emirates.

Rodríguez made his senior debut for Panama in a December 2004 friendly match against Iran and has earned a total of 16 caps, scoring 1 goal. He represented his country in 2 FIFA World Cup qualification matches and played at the 2009 CONCACAF Gold Cup.

His final international was a January 2013 Copa Centroamericana match against Guatemala.

International goals
Scores and results list Panama's goal tally first.

Honors
Club

National Titles
'''Liga Panameña de Fútbol: Apertura 2009 II

References

External links

Profile at GolGolGol.net

1984 births
Living people
Sportspeople from Colón, Panama
Association football forwards
Panamanian footballers
Panama international footballers
2005 UNCAF Nations Cup players
2009 UNCAF Nations Cup players
2009 CONCACAF Gold Cup players
2013 Copa Centroamericana players
Copa Centroamericana-winning players
Categoría Primera A players
C.D. Árabe Unido players
Deportivo Pereira footballers
Envigado F.C. players
La Equidad footballers
C.D. FAS footballers
León de Huánuco footballers
Alianza F.C. footballers
San Francisco F.C. players
Panamanian expatriate footballers
Expatriate footballers in Colombia
Expatriate footballers in El Salvador
Expatriate footballers in Peru
Panamanian expatriate sportspeople in Colombia
Liga Panameña de Fútbol players